Pithea is a monotypic moth genus in the family Erebidae. Its only species, Pithea ferruginea, is found in Colombia. Both the genus and species were first described by Francis Walker in 1856.

References

Phaegopterina
Monotypic moth genera
Moths described in 1856
Moths of South America